Black Desert Online is a sandbox-oriented fantasy massively multiplayer online role-playing game (MMORPG) developed by Korean video game developer Pearl Abyss and originally published for Microsoft Windows in 2014. A mobile version titled Black Desert Mobile was initially released in Asia by early 2019, and worldwide in December 2019. The Xbox One and PlayStation 4 versions, known simply as Black Desert, were released in 2019. The game is free-to-play in some parts of the world, but follows a buy-to-play business model in other editions, including the English-language editions.

In 2018, Pearl Abyss began work on a prequel to the timeline of Black Desert, titled Crimson Desert, but during development it became a separate, stand alone IP with a different storyline and new characters.

In 2021, Kakao Games stopped services and Pearl Abyss took back over the publishing rights.

Gameplay

The combat in Black Desert Online is action based, requiring manual aiming and free movement similar to those found in third-person shooters. The game offers housing, fishing, farming, and trading, as well as large player versus player siege events, and castle battles. It is well regarded for its advanced and in-depth character customization.

An active combat system requires precise manual aiming, dodging and using combos, unlike the tab-targeting system seen in most MMORPGs. Skills can be activated through use of combos for attacking, dodging or blocking. Players are also able to engage in mounted combat. Mounts are acquired by taming in the wild, and players are able to breed special mounts by mating certain types. Mounts require feeding and care, cannot be stored in the inventory, and may be killed.

The game includes a number of features to assist with immersion and the sandbox aspect. The dynamic, worldwide weather system includes large-scale events such as typhoons and will influence gameplay. Localized weather will include events such as temporary fog, which players may exploit to launch surprise attacks on rival guild structures. There is also a dynamic day/night cycle with a gradual progression of lighting effects. During the night some non-player characters (NPCs) will become unavailable as they return home and the monsters will drop more loot. Different game content is available depending upon whether it is night or day. Player housing is instanced and varies in size and location. Players are able to furnish and equip their housing by purchasing furniture through NPCs or through crafting.

Setting
Black Desert Online takes place in a high fantasy setting and revolves around the conflict between two rival nations, the Republic of Calpheon and the Kingdom of Valencia. Calpheon is very materialistic whereas Valencia is very spiritual.

Long ago, the four main areas, Calpheon, Serendia, Balenos, and Mediah, were at peace. This all changed when the Black Death started spreading via merchants from Valencia, in an area east of Mediah that controlled trading. Many around the world died of the plague. Some who did not, were expelled due to the black death causing paranoia. Eventually, the three of the main areas made an alliance and began a war that lasted for 30 years; with Mediah profiting the most by harvesting black stones and trading it to the others.

After the war, the alliance slowly started to conduct trades with Valencia once again. Tensions arose when the other areas discovered the importance of black stones. Desperate to gain wealth, they began to search for black stones as well. Calpheon had no area that harbored the precious black stones, thus they stole from the rest. This created further conflicts with Valencia, due to the fact that Valencia has a vast Black Desert which holds many black stones.

Classes
The game currently has 26 classes available of which are the Warrior, Ranger, Sorceress, Berserker, Tamer, Musa, Maehwa, Valkyrie, Kunoichi, Ninja, Wizard, Witch, Dark Knight, Striker, Mystic, Archer, Lahn, Shai, Guardian, Hashashin, Nova, Sage, Corsair, Drakania, Woosa and Maegu.

Development and release history

Early PC development and release 
Black Desert Online has been in development since 2010. The Korean studio Pearl Abyss was founded in September 2010 by Kim Daeil, previously a developer with Hangame and NHN Gaming, and began development of Black Desert Online shortly after. The game uses Pearl Abyss' custom Black Desert game engine specifically created to handle the fast rendering required for its seamless world and large-scale castle sieges with a lot of characters.

After agreeing a Japanese publishing deal with GameOn Japan on 8 September 2012 Pearl Abyss began releasing details of the game to the public. In November 2012 the game was demonstrated at G-Star. Black Desert Online was also showcased at Gamescom 2013.

Black Desert Online entered closed beta testing in October 2013. A second, three week long closed beta test begun in April 2014. Open beta was launched in December 2014.

The game was released in Korea, Japan and Russia in 2015, in North America and Europe on 3 March 2016, in South America, Turkey, and countries in the Middle East and North Africa region in 2017 and Southeast Asia in 2018. Black Desert Online uses a free-to-play model in Korea, Japan and Russia, while in Taiwan, South East Asia, Europe, North America and South America the game uses a buy-to-play model.

Post-launch PC development

The Mediah Expansion was released in the North American/European version on 30 March 2016. Mediah Part 2 was released on 4 May 2016. The new classes called the Musa, the Maehwa, the Kunoichi and the Ninja were released for play in 2016, followed by the Dark Knight and the Striker in 2017, the Lahn in 2018, and the Shai in 2019. The Valencia I Expansion was released in the North American / European version on 29 June 2016. All expansions and class additions have been free of charge in the buy-to-play model, with no plans of charging for additional future content stated. An updated PC version retitled Black Desert Remastered, featuring new visuals and new audio, was released on 22 August 2018.

In October 2015, Black Desert Online was published and localized in Russia by Cypriot publisher GameNet. This contract expired on October 12, 2018, without an agreement as to account information, including character data. Pearl Abyss has apologized to Russian players and announced they would self-publish in Russia when their own localization efforts were completed. In April 2018, Pearl Abyss announced that it would be changing service providers on North American servers to improve stability. In February 2019, changes were made to the Marketplace to create the new Central Market, which features more user-friendly ways to buy and sell items from the Marketplace.

A major content update was included with the Drakania & Eternal Winter update on April 6, 2022. This update included a new region and class.

Pearl Abyss Japan announced that the service is operated in 150 countries in Japan. Bonus points are given to logged-in players as a 150-country operation gift.

Console versions 
At the Taipei Games Show in January 2017, Pearl Abyss stated Xbox One and PlayStation 4 versions of the game are in development, and was confirmed again by Pearl Abyss in March. The Xbox One version, simply titled Black Desert, was revealed during Microsoft's E3 2017 press conference. It was launched live in North America and Europe on 4 March 2019, following multiple beta releases since 2018. In terms of content, however, the Xbox version of game was about three years behind the PC version upon its release. The Striker, Dark Knight, Lahn, and Musa classes were made available for the Xbox One players in April 2019.

The PlayStation 4 version was released on 22 August 2019.

The console versions started featuring support for cross-platform play between both consoles by March 2020.

Mobile versions 
In August 2017, Pearl Abyss has released an official teaser for Black Desert Mobile. It was released for the Android and iOS in February 2018, initially only in Korea, Japan and Taiwan, with the English version released in December 2019, during The Game Awards 2019.

Reception

Black Desert beta has been well received. The full game has received mixed or average reviews from critics, currently holding an average score of 73/100 across the PC, PS4, and Xbox One versions on Metacritic.

In April 2016, the publisher Kakao Games announced that Black Desert Online had achieved sales of 400,000 copies in its first month on the European and North American markets and was showing an average of 100,000 concurrent users. By March 2017, Black Desert had 3.4 million registered players in North America and Europe. By May 2018, more than 1.2 million copies of the game have sold on Steam in Europe and North America. As of September 2018, the game had over 10million registered users worldwide.

By April 2019, the game had reached over 18 million players, and its total revenue had passed $1 billion. , the game has reached 40million players and grossed  worldwide.

See also 
 Guild Wars 2
 Lost Ark
 Blade & Soul

References

External links 

 Official website

2015 video games
Active massively multiplayer online games
Android (operating system) games
Fantasy massively multiplayer online role-playing games
Free-to-play video games
IOS games
Massively multiplayer online role-playing games
Persistent worlds
PlayStation 4 games
Video games about ninja
Video games developed in South Korea
Video games using Havok
Virtual economies
Windows games
Xbox Cloud Gaming games
Xbox One games
Video games with customizable avatars
Kakao Games games
Pearl Abyss games